Arnaud Amalric (died 1225) was a Cistercian abbot who played a prominent role in the Albigensian Crusade. It is reported that prior to the  massacre of Béziers, Amalric, when asked how to distinguish Cathars from Catholics, responded, "Kill them [all], for God knows which are His own."

Early life
He was abbot of Poblet in Catalonia from 1196 to 1198, then of Grandselve from 1198 to 1202. He then became the seventeenth abbot of Cîteaux (until 1212).

Albigensian Crusade
In 1204, he was named a papal legate and inquisitor and was sent by Pope Innocent III with Peter of Castelnau and Arnoul to attempt the conversion of the Albigensians. Failing, he distinguished himself by the zeal with which he incited men by his preaching to the crusade against them. He was in charge of the crusader army that sacked Béziers in 1209. There, according to the Cistercian writer Caesarius of Heisterbach, Arnaud responded when asked by a Crusader how to distinguish the Cathars from the Catholics:
Caedite eos. Novit enim Dominus qui sunt eius (Kill them. For the Lord knows who are His.). 
That is the origin of the modern phrase: "Kill them all and let God sort them out."

Caesarius did not hear that statement first hand but merely wrote that Arnaud was reported to have said it (dixisse fertur in the original text). This famous response is widely considered apocryphal. “The notorious phrase, ‘kill them all, God will know his own’… is usually (although not invariably) discounted by serious historians. However, the quotation is frequently used by those wishing to promote the idea of northern brutality, intent upon crushing southern civilisation… It is noticeable that most commentators insert “all” for the sake of emphasis and omit fertur dixisse by which Caesarius makes clear that this is hearsay.” 

Arnaud himself, in a letter to the Pope in August 1209 (col.139), wrote:
...dum tractatetur cum baronibus de liberatione illorum qui in civitate ipsa catholici censebantur, ribaldi et alii viles et inermes personæ, non exspectato mandato principum, in civitatem fecerunt insultum, et mirantibus nostris, cum clamaretur : Ad arma, ad arma, quasi sub duarum vel trium horarum spatio, transcensis fossatis ac muro, capta est civitas Biterrensis, nostrique non parcentes ordini, sexui, vel ætati, fere viginti millia hominum in ore gladii peremerunt; factaque hostium strage permaxima, spoliata est tota civitas et succensa...

...while discussions were still going on with the barons about the release of those in the city who were deemed to be Catholics, the servants and other persons of low rank and unarmed attacked the city without waiting for orders from their leaders. To our amazement, crying "to arms, to arms!", within the space of two or three hours they crossed the ditches and the walls and Béziers was taken. Our men spared no one, irrespective of rank, sex or age, and put to the sword almost 20,000 people. After this great slaughter the whole city was despoiled and burnt... 

Amalric's account of the death of 20,000 was likely exaggerated, just like Peter of Vaux de Cernay's report that 7,000 were slain in the Church of St Magdalene. The town's population at the time is estimated at 10,000–14,500, and an unknown number may have escaped the massacre. Christopher Tyerman says that "[t]he true figure was almost certainly far less." Historian Laurence W. Marvin calls Amalric's exhortation "apocryphal", adding that the "speed and spontaneity of the attack indicates that the legate may not have actually known what was going on until it was over". Marvin claims that "clearly most of Beziers' population and buildings survived" and that the city "continued to function as a major population center."

After helping the Crusaders capture Carcassonne, Amalric was replaced as commander of the army by Simon de Montfort, 5th Earl of Leicester. However, he continued to accompany the men and to exercise significant authority.
 On July 22, the Siege of Minerve concluded when the town's defenders agreed to surrender. Simon and the commander of the defenders, Guilhem de Minerve agreed to terms of surrender. However, Amalric, who had been absent at the time, returned to camp. He insisted that no agreements could be considered binding without the assent of himself as papal legate. Simon wished to treat the occupants leniently, but Amalric wanted them put to death. Eventually, the two worked out a solution. The Crusaders allowed the soldiers defending the town, as well as the Catholics inside of it, to leave. The Cathars who had not yet reached the status of perfect were also allowed to go free. The Cathar perfects were given the choice to return to Catholicism or face death. This solution angered many of the soldiers, who had wanted to participate in a massacre. Amalric calmed them by insisting that the majority of perfects would not recant. His prediction was correct. Only three women recanted. The remaining 140 were burned at the stake.

Later life
According to Louis Moréri, Amalric was named archbishop of Narbonne about 1212, after his return from an expedition into Spain to encourage the Christians against the Moors. He left an account of this expedition. His stirring spirit embroiled him with his sovereign, Simon de Montfort. In 1224, he presided in the council of Montpellier, assembled to consider the complaints of the Albigensians.

Very little is known about Amalric's life after 1222. History justified the absence by noting that contrary to expectations, he took no part in the ongoing quarrels between the sons of Montfort and Raymond. On 29 September 1225, Amalric died in Fontfroide, France.

References

Bibliography

Secondary sources

Primary sources
 

Albigensian Crusade
12th-century births
1225 deaths
French abbots
Cistercian abbots general
History of Dijon
Aude
French Cistercians
Archbishops of Narbonne
13th-century French Roman Catholic bishops
People of the Albigensian Crusade
Christian anti-Gnosticism
Armed priests